Crassula helmsii, known as swamp stonecrop or New Zealand pigmyweed, is an aquatic or semiterrestrial species of succulent plant in the family Crassulaceae. Originally found in Australia and New Zealand, it has been introduced around the world. In the United Kingdom, this plant is one of five introduced invasive aquatic plants that were banned from sale from April 2014, the first ban of its kind in the country. It is on the Global Biodiversity Information Facility's Global Register of Introduced and Invasive Species of eleven countries.

Description
Small white flowers with four petals are produced in summer on long stalks arising from the upper leaf axils. The flowers are always above water.

Distribution

On the island of Ireland, C. helmsii has recently been recorded on waste ground in Ireland at Howth Head, County Dublin, and at a number of sites in Northern Ireland.

Ecological aspects
The plant grows on the muddy margins of ponds where it forms carpets with 100% cover, semi-submerged in deeper water, or totally submerged with elongated stems. It does not die back in winter. It has been reported to be very tolerant to copper toxicity and to be a hyperaccumulator of copper.

Cultivation
C. helmsii is able to grow fully submerged in a cool-water aquarium or as a submersed or marginal plant in a pond. Once established it can grow vigorously and may need to be trimmed back. Schedule 9 of the UK Wildlife and Countryside Act 1981 lists this plant as one that must not be caused to grow in the wild.

References

External links

 Crassula helmsii GBIF (images, distribution, invasive species status)
 BioImages
 Status in N. Ireland includes an introduction on UK information
 Flora of N. Ireland - illustrated
 Ecological information

helmsii
Flora of New Zealand
Saxifragales of Australia
Flora of New South Wales
Flora of Victoria (Australia)
Flora of Tasmania
Eudicots of Western Australia
Flora of South Australia
Plants described in 1899
Taxa named by Thomas Kirk